"Pure Love" is a single by Iranian–Swedish singer Arash, which was released in 2008 by Warner Music. It features Swedish singer Helena.

Track listing

Charts

Weekly charts

Year-end charts

References

2008 songs
Arash (singer) songs
Songs written by Robert Uhlmann (composer)
Songs written by Arash (singer)